Alessio Codromaz (born 5 June 1994) is an Italian footballer of Slovene origin .

Club career
Codromaz started his career at Friuli club Corno. He then moved to Veneto club Vicenza. Codromaz was a full member of "Primavera" under-20 team in 2011–12 season. He was released on 30 June 2012. In August 2012 he was signed by Slovenian club ND Gorica on a free transfer. He signed a 4-year contract on 1 July 2013. On 9 August 2013 he left for Brda. He also played 4 times for Gorica at the start of 2013–14 Slovenian PrvaLiga.

On 3 September 2014 he left for Tolmin on a one-year deal. He renewed the contract on 6 August 2015.

References

External links
 

1994 births
Living people
Footballers from Trieste
Italian Slovenes
Italian footballers
Association football defenders
L.R. Vicenza players
ND Gorica players
NK Brda players
Italian expatriate footballers
Expatriate footballers in Slovenia
Italian expatriate sportspeople in Slovenia
Slovenian PrvaLiga players